is a railway station on the Hokuriku Main Line in the city of Fukui, Fukui Prefecture, Japan, operated by the West Japan Railway Company (JR West).

Lines

Station layout
The station consists of two opposed side platforms connected by a footbridge. The station is unattended.

Platforms

History
Ōdoro Station opened on July 15, 1896.  With the privatization of Japanese National Railways (JNR) on 1 April 1987, the station came under the control of JR West.

Passenger statistics
In fiscal 2016, the station was used by an average of 315 passengers daily (boarding passengers only).

Surrounding area
Fukui Minami Prefectural High School
Harmony Hall Fukui

See also
 List of railway stations in Japan

References

External links

  

Railway stations in Fukui Prefecture
Stations of West Japan Railway Company
Railway stations in Japan opened in 1896
Hokuriku Main Line
Fukui (city)